Marie of Blois (1345–1404) was a daughter of Joan of Penthièvre, Duchess of Brittany and Charles of Blois, Duke of Brittany. Through her marriage to Louis I, Duke of Anjou, she became Duchess of Anjou, Countess of Maine, Duchess of Touraine, titular Queen of Naples and Jerusalem and Countess of Provence.

Biography
Marie married Louis I, son of John II of France, in 1360. Throughout their marriage his official titles increased, though he would never actually rule the Kingdom of Naples. After his death in 1384, most of the towns in Provence revolted against her son, Louis II. Marie pawned her valuables and raised an army.

She, her young son and the army went from town to town to gain support. In 1387 Louis II was formally recognized as Count in Aix-en-Provence. She then appealed to Charles VI of France to support her son in obtaining Naples. In 1390, Louis, supported by the pope and the French, set sail for Naples. Marie negotiated for a marriage between Louis and Yolande of Aragon, to prevent the Aragonese from obstructing him there.

They finally wed in 1400.  Marie was an able administrator and on her deathbed revealed to Louis that she had saved the amount of 200,000 écus. This was to make sure that she could pay his ransom in case he was captured.

Issue
With Louis I she had the following children:
 Marie (1370 – after 1383)
 Louis II of Anjou (1377 – 1417)
Charles (1380 – 1404, Angers), Prince of Taranto, Count of Roucy, Étampes, and Gien

References

Sources

1345 births
1404 deaths
14th-century French women
15th-century French women
15th-century French people
14th-century French people
15th-century French nobility
Duchesses of Anjou
Countesses of Maine
Countesses of Provence